The Austrian Olympic Committee (ÖOC) is the non-profit organization representing Austrian athletes in the International Olympic Committee (IOC). The ÖOC also represents the selection of Austrian cities in their bid for being the site for an Olympic Games. 

ÖOC is headquartered in Vienna.

History
The Austrian Olympic Committee was created in 1908 and formally recognized by the IOC in 1912.

List of presidents

Member federations
The Austrian National Federations are the organizations that coordinate all aspects of their individual sports. They are responsible for training, competition and development of their sports. There are currently 32 Olympic Summer and 6 Winter Sport Federations in Austria.

See also
Austria at the Olympics

References

External links
 Official website 

Austria at the Olympics
National Olympic Committees
Oly
1908 establishments in Austria

Sports organizations established in 1908